Hugh Anthony St. Leger (c. 1857Q4 1925) was an English journalist and author of juvenile fiction. He was the third youngest of eight children, but his two younger siblings both died in early childhood. His father died when he was four and St. Leger was elected to a place at the Clergy Orphan School as a result. He turned his experiences in the Merchant Navy and as a Hussar in a solid background for boy's adventure fiction.

Early life
The England and Wales Christening Index shows him being baptised on 7 June 1857. He gave his age as 43 years and two months on 26 March 1900, which would give him a birth date in January 1857. He does not appear to be listed on the Index of Births. He was the sixth of eight children born to William Nassau St. Leger (180925 April 1861) and Mary Anne Penning York (c. 1842Q2 1889) William Nassau St. Leger had been born in Limerick, Ireland and was a Clergyman of the Church of England.

His siblings were:
 Rupert (c. 18473 March 1916), who attended Queen Elizabeth's School in Ipswich as a Queen's Scholar. Rupert was also awarded an open scholarship at St. Catherine's College, Cambridge, worth some £40 plus a free room. He began his university career on 4 October 1865, was awarded his BA in 1869, ordained as a deacon in 1871, and as a priest in 1872. After 30 years as a curate, he was, in 1891, appointed Vicar to Ridgewell in Essex where he remained until his death. While a curate, he married Mary Jane Matthews (born c. 1885) a farmer's daughter, on 31 January 1880. The couple had 8 children, one of whom died before 1911. Rupert seems to have been a somewhat turbulent priest as he was summonsed for failing to pay the poor rate in May 1893. In August of 1893, his wife unsuccessfully prosecuted his curate for an indecent assault. In November, 1893 Rupert was back in court again, this time as a defendant as he was summonsed for failing to send one of his seven surviving children to school.
 Marion (c. 1849) who worked as a governess, including for her brother Rupert. She became the third wife of Lear George Buckland Howe (c. 1844Q1 1914) in Stockwell on 4 July 1909.
 Warham (c. 1851Q3 1921) who attended the Clergy Orphan School at Canterbury and then Jesus College in Cambridge where he received his BA degree in 1876. He described himself initially as a journalist and later as a journalist and author in the census returns. The British Library shows him as having published several books, songs, and comic operas. He married Lisette Olivia Butler (c. 18491st quarter of 1919), the daughter of a deceased clergyman, in London on 18 September 1895.
 Arthur (c. 1853). The 1871 census found him in the Cavalry Barracks in Ipswich, having enlisted in the Royal Artillery. No further information on his career was found. Hubert followed him into the military several years later. 

William Douglas (c. 185522 December 1921), attended Aspley School in Aspley Guise, and became the organist there after leaving school, giving lessons in the piano and organ. He emigrated to India where he married the seventeen-year old Emma Ethel Antoinette Stuart (c. 186310 March 1882) on 21 June 1880. They had one child in the following year. He was then the organist at St. George's Anglican Cathedral in Madras (now called Chennai). Emma and her daughter died within days of each other in 1882. William married Helen Louise Clerk (23 August 1857Q1 1949) on 15 May 1889, and the couple had four children. William was an officer in the Madras Volunteer Guards and had reached the rank of Lt. Colonel when he retired in 1903. By 1913 he was the manager of The Madras Mail, and was still there in 1918. In 1920 he travelled to England where he died the following year.
 Ralph G (c. 1859Q3 1861) who died when he was two, in the same quarter as this younger sister.
 Anna (19 April 1861Q3 1961), who died as an infant. Her father died eight days after her birth.

Election to the Clergy Orphan School
In 1868 St. Leger followed in his brother Warham's footsteps and was elected to the Clergy Orphan School, aged c. 11. He was a pupil there during the 1871 census. The boys' school was then based in Canterbury. Students were elected to places in the school by the subscribers to the school. St. Leger had the fourth-highest number of votes for boys. The subscribers got a list of candidates a month before the election, and selected all those whose candidacy they favoured.

St. Ledger and his siblings were not alone in becoming orphans. Farr's Life Table No. 3 show that in the period 1838 to 1864 an man who reached the age of 25, the age at which many young clergymen would have completed their academic training and been ordained, had an roughly one in three chance of dying before he was 55. The odds were better than this as Clergymen suffered lower mortality than other professions. The risk of a clergyman of 25 dying was about one in four in 1861-1871. By contrast, the latest life table from the UK's Office of National Statistics, Life Table No. 17 based on data in 20102012 shows that the risk of man aged 25 dying before 55 is now less than one in twenty.

Working life
Under the bye-laws of the Clergy Orphan Corporation, no boy could remain in the school past 15 years of age without the special leave of the committee. At that age, boys could be indentured as apprentices. The title of the charity specifically referred to "clothing, maintaining, and educating poor orphans of clergymen ...until of age to be put apprentice". A boy named Hugh Anthony St. Leger, of the right age became a Merchant Navy apprentice indentured to C. F. Ellis of London for four years from 23 November 1872. Unusually, no name of vessel is given.

Military service
During the Second Anglo-Boer War, St. Leger enlisted in the Imperial Yeomanry on a short service, one year, enlistment in Ipswich on 26 March 1900, giving his age as 43 years and 2 months. He declared that he had previously served in the 19th Hussars, 2nd Dragoons, and had completed his agreed term of service. He was discharged at his own request eight days later on 2 April 1900. St. Ledger served in the Merchant Navy, but he may also have served in the Royal Navy, as he told the bankruptcy court in 1903 that he had served in both the Army and the Navy.

Marriages and children
St. Leger married Catherine Ledger (18561912) In St. George's Church in Hanover Square in the third quarter of 1889. The couple had three children, all daughters:
 Kathrine Winifred (13 January 189120 April 1982)
 Phillis Mary Eigen (28 January 189222 September 1986)
 Margaret Evelyn (16 April 18939 January 1979)

St. Leger described himself as a publisher of books in the 1891 census. He then kept a coachman, whose wife acted as cook, along with a nurse, and a house-maid. By the 1901 census, he and his wife was visiting Mary A Baldwin in Colchester. All three girls were away in a school run by Bertha and May Stevenson at 63 Hamilton Road in Reading. His profession was not described as author.

St. Leger petitioned for bankruptcy on 16 May 1903. He was scheduled for a public examined in Colchester Bankruptcy Court at 2pm on 26 June 1903. During his examination he blamed money lenders, whom he said had charged him 300% interest, for his failure. He was declared bankrupt, with effect from 19 June 1903. His trustee, the public received, was released from the trust on 23 November 1903

For the 1911 census, Catherine was living at 3 Rupert Road, Bedford Park, London while St. Leger was in Ipswich, Boarding with Henrietta Frazer Williamson, a widow who had two sons, only one of whom was still living. He gave his occupation as Author. Catherine died on 12 December 1912. St. Leger then married his former landlady, Henrietta Frazer Williamson, at All Angels Church in Bedford Park.

Hugh died in the fourth quarter of 1925. Henrietta survived him by more than 20 years.

Works

In 1893, The North Queensland Register republished a nautical short-story by St. Leger that had already run in Black and White. It is not clear how much St. Leger was contributing to magazines, or where.

List of longer fiction by St. Leger

What is remarkable about St. Leger, is that all of his longer fiction was produced in quite a short period, with seven books from 1894 to 1901.

The list of works below is drawn from searches on Jisc Library Hub Discover.

Note, it is certain that this list is not complete as both the Bristol Times and the Western Morning News refer to Tales Told after "Lights out" as a previous boys' book by St. Leger However, no catalogue details could be found.

The Morning Post complained that Griffith and Farran had reissued three books in a uniform edition without any indication that they were reissues. The three books were:
 In the Queen's Navee C. N. Robinson and J. Leyland
 The Lion Cub by Fred Whishaw, the story of Peter the Great’s youth
 Billets and Bullets by St Ledger
However, only the first of this is clearly a reissue, based on the JISC catalogue data. Moreover, Baker gives 1901 as the year of publication for The Lion Cub. No record of an earlier publication of Billets and Bullets could be found on Jisc Library Hub Discover, on press reviews or advertisements, nor on second-hand book sites. Even so, it is still perfectly possible the St. Leger wrote the book in 1882 or 1883, and later republished it to take advantage of the military enthusiasm accompanying the Anglo-Boer War.

Sample illustrations
The following illustrations, made by William Rainey  (21 July 185224 January 1936) for An Ocean Outlaw: a story of adventure in the good ship "Margaret" (London: Blackie & Son, 1896) give some idea of the frenetic pace of Huge St. Leger's books. Images by courtesy of the British Library

Notes

References

British children's writers
1857 births
1925 deaths